Fifteenmile Creek may refer to:

Fifteenmile Creek (Georgia)
Fifteenmile Creek (Potomac River), Maryland/Pennsylvania
Fifteenmile Creek (Columbia River), Oregon
Fifteenmile Creek (Mississippi River), Mississippi
Fifteenmile Creek (Texas)
Fifteenmile Creek (East Deep Creek), Utah